Dorothy Winifred Wright (19 August 1889 – 1960) was an English sailor who competed in the 1920 Summer Olympics representing Great Britain.

She was a crew member of the British boat Ancora, which won the gold medal in the 7 metre class. She was the wife of fellow crew member Cyril Wright.

By being a married couple to win an Olympic gold medal together for Great Britain, Wright and her husband achieved a feat not repeated until Kate and Helen Richardson-Walsh were part of the British team which won gold in women's hockey at the 2016 summer Olympics.

References

External links 
 

1889 births
1960 deaths
British female sailors (sport)
Sailors at the 1920 Summer Olympics – 7 Metre
Olympic sailors of Great Britain
English Olympic medallists
Olympic gold medallists for Great Britain
Olympic medalists in sailing
Medalists at the 1920 Summer Olympics